High Life Music (full name Les Disques HLM High Life Music) is a Montreal based independent record label created in 2002 by Da Vinci of Vice Verset, specialising in urban music. Its artists have been nominated by Association québécoise de líndustrie du disque (ADISQ) in 2006 and 2007 for the Quebec hip-hop album of the year. Some of the music has also been reviewed on CBC Radio.

This label is listed as a cultural business by the Quebec provincial agency SODEC.

Artists
 01 Étranjj
 Ale Dee
 Billy Nova
 Boogat
 Le Cerveau
 Izzo
 Limoilou Starz
 Manu Militari
 Mauvaise Frékentation
 Sir Pathétik
 Vice Verset

References

External links 
 High Life Music High Life Music Official website. 
 High Life Music MySpace site
 High Life Music

Canadian independent record labels
Record labels established in 2002
Companies based in Montreal
2002 establishments in Quebec